Blountsville or Blountville may refer to:
Blountsville, Alabama
Blountsville, Georgia
Blountsville, Indiana
 Blountville, Tennessee

See also 
 Battle of Blountsville